Utkarshini Vashishtha is an Indian Screenwriter who works in Bollywood films. She is known for writing scripts for Bollywood films like Gangubai Kathiawadi (2022) Sarbjit (film) (2016), Goliyon Ki Raasleela Ram-Leela (2013). Vashishtha was the Associate Creative Director for India's Got Talent.

Career 
Vashishtha came into limelight after Sarbjit (film) (for which she has written the Screenplay and Dialogue) got screened in 2016 Cannes Film Festival and was long-listed for the 88th Academy Awards

Filmography

References

External links
 
Book My Show

Living people
Indian columnists
Indian women screenwriters
21st-century Indian women writers
21st-century Indian writers
21st-century Indian dramatists and playwrights
Indian women columnists
21st-century Indian screenwriters
Year of birth missing (living people)